Raul Henrique Srour (born July 1, 1961) is a Brazilian businessman who headed a criminal ring in Operation Car Wash, a corruption scandal.

References

1961 births
Living people
21st-century Brazilian businesspeople
Place of birth missing (living people)